The Bureau of Customs (abbreviated BoC or BOC) is a Philippine government agency under the Department of Finance.  The Bureau of Customs was established on February 6, 1902 by the Insular Government of the Philippine Islands of the United States of America, during the American Colonial Era of the Philippines.

Function
The Bureau has the following duties under the Customs Modernization and Tariff Act (RA 10863):
(a) Assessment and collection of customs revenues from imported goods and other dues, fees, charges, fines and penalties accruing under the CMTA;

(b) Simplification and harmonization of customs procedures to facilitate movement of goods in international trade;

(c) Border control to prevent entry of smuggled goods;

(d) Prevention and suppression of smuggling and other customs fraud;

(e) Facilitation and security of international trade and commerce through an informed compliance program;

(f) Supervision and control over the entrance and clearance of vessels and aircraft engaged in foreign commerce;

(g) Supervision and control over the handling of foreign mails arriving in the Philippines for the purpose of collecting revenues and preventing the entry of contraband;

(h) Supervision and control on all import and export cargoes, landed or stored in piers, airports, terminal facilities, including container yards and freight stations for the protection of government revenue and prevention of entry of contraband;

(i) Conduct a compensation study with the end view of developing and recommending to the President a competitive compensation and remuneration system to attract and retain highly qualified personnel, while ensuring that the Bureau remains financially sound and sustainable;

(j) Exercise of exclusive original jurisdiction over forfeiture cases under the CMTA; and

(k) Enforcement of the CMTA and all other laws, rules and regulations related to customs administration.

History

Prior to European colonization, people in the Philippines traded with others from Southeast Asia. Since money was not yet the medium of exchange, people bartered commodities. The rulers of the barangays collected tributes from the people before they were allowed to engage in trade. The practice of collecting tributes became part of the Customs Law of the Land.

The Spanish colonial era
During the Spanish Colonial Era of the Philippines, Spain passed three important statutes:
 Spanish Customs Law which was similar to that of the Indies enforced in the country from 1582 to 1828. It was a concept of ad valorem levied on import and export.
 A Tariff Board was established which drew up a tariff of fixed values for all imported articles on which ten percent (10%) ad valorem duty was uniformly collected.
 Another Tariff Law was introduced in 1891, which established the specific duties on all imports and on certain exports and this lasted till the end of the Spanish rule in the Philippines.

The American colonial era
When the Americans came to the Philippines, the Military Government continued to enforce the Spanish Tariff Code of 1891, which remained in effect until the Philippine Commission enacted the Tariff Revision Law of 1901.

On October 24, 1900, the Philippine Commission passed Act No. 33 abolishing and changing the position of Captain of the Port to Collector of Customs in all ports of entry except the Port of Manila. The designation of the Captain of the Port in the Port of Manila was retained.

When the Civil Government was established in the Philippines, the most important laws passed by the Philippine Commission were the following:
 Tariff Revision Law of 1902 based on the theory that the laws of Spain were not as comprehensive as the American Customs Laws to conform with the existing conditions of the country.
 Philippine Administrative Act No. 355 passed by the Philippine Commission on February 6, 1902. The full implementation of this Act, however, was considered inadequate and incomplete, so the Customs Service Act No. 355, called the Philippine Customs Service Act was passed to amend the previous laws. After several modifications and amendments, the Philippine Customs Service finally became a practical counterpart of the American Customs Service.
 Act No. 357 reorganized the Philippine Customs Service and officially designated the Insular Collector of Customs as Collector of Customs for the Port of Manila.
 Act No. 625 abolished the Captain of the Port for the Port of Manila.
Public Act No. 430 transformed the Philippine Customs Service to a Bureau of Customs and Immigration under the supervision and control of the Department of Finance and Justice.

When the Department of Justice became a separate office from the Department of Finance, the customs service remained under the umbrella of the latter which set-up remained up to this time.

The Commonwealth Government
After the Philippine Commonwealth was established, the Philippine Legislature enacted Commonwealth Act No. 613 forming the Bureau of Immigration as a separate office from the Bureau of Customs.

On May 1, 1947, the Bureau of Customs has as its head the Insular Collector of Customs. He was assisted by the Deputy Insular Collector of Customs. Both officials were concurrently Collector of Customs and the Deputy Collector of Customs of the Port of Manila. The Republic Pursuant to the Executive Order No. 94 of Republic Act No. 52, the President of the Philippines reorganized the different departments, bureaus, offices and agencies of the government of the Republic of the Philippines. Consequently, the Insular Collector of Customs was changed to Collector of Customs for the Port of Manila. The reorganization took effect on July 1, 1947.

In 1957, Congress enacted the Tariff and Customs Code of the Philippines known as Republic Act No. 1937, otherwise known as the “Tariff Law of the Republic of the Philippines”. This took effect on July 1, 1957. The passage of this act by the defunct Congress of the Philippines subject to the provisions of the Laurel-Langley Agreement, became the first official expression of an autonomous Philippine Tariff Policy.

Before the passage of Republic Act 1937, all importations from the United States enjoyed full exemptions pursuant to the Tariff Act No. 1902 which was adopted by Republic Act No. 3 as the Tariff Laws of the Philippines.

The Republic
Pursuant to the Executive Order No. 94 of Republic Act No. 52, the President of the Philippines reorganized the different departments, bureaus, offices and agencies of the government of the Republic of the Philippines. Consequently, the Insular Collector of Customs was changed to Collector of Customs for the Port of Manila. The reorganization took effect on July 1, 1947.

In 1957, Congress enacted the Tariff and Customs Code of the Philippines known as Republic Act No. 1937, otherwise known as the “Tariff Law of the Republic of the Philippines”. This took effect on July 1, 1957. The passage of this act by the defunct Congress of the Philippines subject to the provisions of the Laurel-Langley Agreement, became the first official expression of an autonomous Philippine Tariff Policy.

2017 drug smuggling scandal
On May 28, 2017, the Bureau of Customs (BOC) seized  worth of methamphetamine in two warehouses in Barangay Ugong of Valenzuela, Metro Manila. The BOC said that they acted on an intelligence report from the Chinese General Administration of Customs. The seizure was made in accordance to a Letter of Authority issued by BOC Commissioner Nicanor Faeldon. The BOC officials were accompanied by personnel of the National Bureau of Investigation and Philippine Drug Enforcement Agency who inspected the warehouses found the contraband in five metal cylinders.

During the Senate and House hearings, details on how the shipment was smuggled into the Philippines were given. On May 16, 2017, the ship Guang Ping Voyage No. 1719S, which carried the container with the methamphetamine arrived at the Manila International Container Port (MICP) in Tondo, Manila. The cargo of the ship was lodged on the next day by Customs broker, Teejay Marcellana, who claims that the shipment contained kitchenware. The following day, the importer of the goods, EMT Trading, which is owned by Eirene Tatad, paid the customs and duties for the shipment. The firm says that they were not aware of the illegal drugs inside the shipment. The shipment was then passed through the green lane where shipments were not scanned through X-ray. According to protocol, shipments accepted by first-time importers or from China were not allowed to be passed through the green lane. A truck registered under Golden Strike Logistics transported the container from the MICP on May 23. Chinese businessman Richard Tan, also known as Chen Ju Long, narrated during the congressional hearing that he called the Bureau of Customs at 11pm after he was informed about the illegal drugs shipment by Zhang Xiaohui of the Chinese General Administration of Customs. Customs broker, Mark Taguba claims that Tan was behind the smuggling of the drugs who says that he was hired by the businessman to "fix" the shipment through a middle man named Kenneth Dong.

The Philippine Senate Blue Ribbon Committee investigated and called the BOC personnel with links to the case as either incompetent or corrupt.

Organization

Office of the Commissioner (OCOM)
The Bureau of Customs is headed by a Commissioner, who is responsible for the general administration and management of the bureau. The Commissioner is assisted by six Deputy Commissioners and an Assistant Commissioner, who supervises the Internal Administration Group, Revenue Collection Monitoring Group, Assessment and Operations Coordination Group, Intelligence Group, Enforcement Group, Management Information System and Technology Group and Post Clearance Audit Group.

Customs Intelligence and Investigation Service (CIIS)

The Customs Intelligence and Investigation Service (CIIS) is the service of the Bureau mandated to the collection, collation, and evaluation of data and information on acts of economic sabotage and the conduct of surveillance, investigation and apprehension of cases involving violations of customs, tariff laws and regulations.

Customs Districts

The Bureau of Customs has 17 Customs Districts (as enumerated below). Each Customs District is headed and supervised by a District Collector, assisted by as many Deputy District Collectors as may be necessary. A Customs District has a designated “principal port of entry”. Generally, a principal port of entry has its “sub-port(s) of entry”.

Commissioners

See also
 Department of Finance
 Bureau of Customs Transformers (basketball)
 Bureau of Customs Transformers (volleyball)

References

External links
 

Philippines
Customs
Customs
Department of Finance (Philippines)
Philippine Drug War